Wang Shixuan (王士選, born 17 August 1914, date of death unknown) was a Chinese basketball player. He competed in the men's tournament at the 1936 Summer Olympics.

References

External links

1914 births
Year of death missing
Chinese men's basketball players
Olympic basketball players of China
Basketball players at the 1936 Summer Olympics
Place of birth missing
Place of death missing
Republic of China men's national basketball team players